Euprotomus aurora is a species of sea snail, a marine gastropod mollusc in the family Strombidae, the true conchs.

Description

Distribution

References

Strombidae
Gastropods described in 2001